Zhu Lühe (1877 – April 13, 1945) was a politician and judicial officer in the Republic of China. He was an important politician during the Reformed Government of the Republic of China and the Wang Jingwei regime. His courtesy name was Xiaoshan. He was born in Jiaxing, Zhejiang.

Biography
First he went to study to United Kingdom, later he returned to China, he became the Secretary of the Debate Commission for Legal and Rights and the Special Conference for Customs.

In June, 1927, he was appointed to the Chief of the Bureau for General Affairs of the Ministry for Foreign Affairs, National Government. On October, he was transferred to the Chief of the Second Bureau of same Ministry. In next February, he was appointed to the Secretary of the Ministry for Justice, on next month, he promoted to the Vice-Minister for Justice (His position became the Political Affairs Vice-Minister on November). In April, 1930, he promoted to the acting Minister for Judicial Administrating, and on December, he also held the Member of the Legislative Yuan. In next December, Luo Wengan　was appointed to the Minister for Justice, so Zhu Lühe returned to the Political Affairs Vice-Minister for Judicial Administrating. In January, 1932, he resigned his post.

In August, 1938, Zhu Lühe was appointed to the Vice-Minister for Judicial Administrating. In next May, he promoted to the Chief Justice of the Supreme Court. In March, 1940, Wang Jinwei Regime was established, Zhu was appointed to the Vice-Chief of the Judicial Yuan and the Member of the Central Political Committee. On April, Zhu also held the Chairperson of the Disciplinary Action Committee for Central Public Servants.

Zhu Lühe died on April 13, 1945.

Notes

References

General references
 Zheng Renjia, "The Biographical Sketch of Zhu Lühe"Biographical Writings Website (need Traditional Chinese font)
 
 
 

Politicians from Jiaxing
Republic of China politicians from Zhejiang
Chinese collaborators with Imperial Japan
1877 births
1945 deaths